The Turkish women's national ice hockey team represents Turkey at the International Ice Hockey Federation's World Women's Ice Hockey Championship Division IV. The women's national team, established in late 2006, is controlled by Turkish Ice Hockey Federation (TBHF). As of 2011, Turkey has 160 female players. The Turkish women's national team is ranked 33rd in the world.

History
The Turkish women team made its first appearance at the 2007 Women's World Championships Division IV tournament held between 26 March through 1 April in Miercurea Ciuc, Romania.

Women's ice hockey sport in Turkey began in 2005 with the forming of women's clubs in Ankara. The first official competitions were a cup and a tournament held in 2006. The first women's ice hockey league started on 17 February 2007 with the participation of 6 teams from Ankara and one team from Kocaeli.

The national team was selected following national team camps. The first team coach was Canadian Clive R. Tolley from Moose Jaw, Saskatchewan, who has assumed the head coach duties for the Turkish senior men's, juniors' (under 20) and espoir (under 18) teams for 4 years term with a trial period of January–June 2007.

Olympics
The Turkey women's hockey team has never qualified for an Olympic tournament.

Ice hockey at the 2018 Winter Olympics – Women's qualification

Ice hockey at the 2022 Winter Olympics – Women's qualification

Qualification Results
OTW and OTL Suppose Draw.

World Championship
The Turkish squad made its international debut at the World Championship held in Miercurea Ciuc, Romania between 26 March through 1 April, playing in the Division IV, which got together from the teams of Romania, Estonia, New Zealand, Iceland and Croatia besides of Turkey.

The women's team played its first match against the host team Romania and was defeated by 27–0 (7–0, 11–0, 9–0). Turkish women lost their second match to Estonia with 1–14 (0–6, 0–5, 1–3), while Elif Ulaş scored the national team's first ever goal in the history. The third match was lost to New Zealand with 19–0 (9–0, 6–0, 4–0). Turkey was defeated in its 4th match by Iceland with 1–12 (0–3, 0–3, 1–6). The only Turkish goal was scored by İrem Ayan. The women's squad lost against Croatia with 1–19. The team ranked last (6th).

2007 – 33rd place (6th in Division IV)
2008 – 33rd place (6th in Division IV)
2009 – The Division III, Division IV and Division V were not played, as the respective tournaments were cancelled.
2011 – 34th place (5th in Division V)
2013 – 33rd place (1st in Division IIB qualification, promoted to Division IIB)
2014 – 33rd place (6th in Division IIB, relegated to Division IIB qualification)
2015 – 33rd place (1st in Division IIB qualification, promoted to Division IIB)
2016 – 32nd place (6th in Division IIB)
2017 – 31st place (5th in Division IIB)
2018 – 31st place (5th in Division IIB)
2019 – 32nd place (4th in Division IIB)
2020 – 32nd place (4th in Division IIB)
2021 – Cancelled due to the COVID-19 pandemic
2022 – 29th place (3rd in Division IIB)
2023 – Withdrawn due to the 2023 Turkey–Syria earthquake

Results
OTW and OTL Suppose Draw.

European Championships
The Turkish women's hockey team never participated in the IIHF European Women Championships.

Friendly
2017: Ukraine 5 - 1	Turkey

2016: Germany 22 - 0	Turkey

Ice hockey at the 2011 Winter Universiade - 6 Lose (0-98 / -98)

Results Summary
As of 1 Jan 2023.

OTW and OTL Suppose Draw.

All-time Record against other nations

Current roster

Legend
 A: Assistant captain
 C: Captain

Notable former players
 Mine Güngör
 Ceren Alkan
 Sinem Doğu
 Merve Arıncı
 Simge Ozer-Sevilmiş
 Huriye Yeliz Yüksel
 Maria Jasmina Decu
 Selin Erenoğlu
 İrem Ayan
 Teksin Öztekin
 Tanay Günay
 Çisel Ann Otts
 Tuba Dokur
 Burcu Turanal

References

External links

IIHF profile
National Teams of Ice Hockey

National Team
Women's national ice hockey teams in Europe
I